The 2008 United States presidential election in Louisiana took place on November 4, 2008, was part of the 2008 United States presidential election. Voters chose nine representatives, or electors to the Electoral College, who voted for president and vice president.

Louisiana was won by Republican nominee John McCain by an 18.6% margin of victory. Prior to the election, all 17 news organizations considered this a state McCain would win, or otherwise a "red state". Although Bill Clinton carried the state twice, it has since shifted strongly toward the Republican Party. This is despite its having one of the largest percentages of African Americans in the country, one of the Democratic Party's most reliable voting blocs and which gave record-breaking support to Obama, the first African American on a major-party presidential ticket. Its shift to the right has been due almost entirely to its white population, which has become overwhelmingly Republican in the 21st century. It was one of five states to swing Republican from 2004. This marked the first time that Louisiana failed to back the winning candidate since 1968, when it voted for third-party candidate George Wallace. In doing so, Obama became the first winning Democratic presidential nominee to lose Louisiana since Lyndon B. Johnson in 1964, and to lose Calcasieu Parish since the parish's founding in 1840.

Primaries
 2008 Louisiana Democratic presidential primary
 2008 Louisiana Republican presidential caucuses and primary

Campaign

Predictions
There were 16 news organizations who made state-by-state predictions of the election. Here are their last predictions before election day:

Polling

McCain won every pre-election poll. The final 3 polls averaged McCain leading 50% to 40%.

Fundraising
John McCain raised a total of $2,175,416 in the state. Barack Obama raised $1,438,276.

Advertising and visits
Obama spent $368,039. McCain and his interest groups spent $6,019. McCain visited the state once, in New Orleans.

Analysis

Polling in Louisiana gave a strong lead to McCain, sometimes as high as 19%, and Barack Obama did not seriously contest the state. Governor Bobby Jindal endorsed McCain early on in the primary season. Louisiana was also one of only two states to list Ron Paul on their official ballot (the other being Montana which gave the largest percentage to any third-party candidate nationwide).

In 2008, Louisiana was one of five states that swung even more Republican from 2004. John McCain carried Louisiana with 58.56% of the vote, a tad bit better than George W. Bush's 56.72% of the vote in 2004.

At the same time, however, incumbent Democratic U.S. Senator Mary Landrieu avoided the Republican trend in the state and held onto her U.S. Senate seat, taking in 52.11% of the vote to State Treasurer John N. Kennedy, a Democrat who switched parties to run against Landrieu. Republicans picked up two U.S. House seats in Louisiana (LA-02 and LA-06 with Joseph Cao and Bill Cassidy, respectively). In terrible year for the Republican Party nationwide, Louisiana provided the GOP with a ray of hope and optimism.

Results

By parish

Parishes that flipped from Republican to Democratic
 Caddo (largest city: Shreveport)
 East Baton Rouge (largest city: Baton Rouge)

Parishes that flipped from Democratic to Republican
 Assumption (largest city: Napoleonville)
 Pointe Coupee (largest city: New Roads)

By congressional district
John McCain carried 6 of the state's 7 congressional districts, both McCain and Obama won a district won by the other party.

Electors

Technically the voters of Louisiana cast their ballots for electors: representatives to the Electoral College. Louisiana is allocated 9 electors because it has 7 congressional districts and 2 senators. All candidates who appear on the ballot or qualify to receive write-in votes must submit a list of 9 electors, who pledge to vote for their candidate and his or her running mate. Whoever wins the majority of votes in the state is awarded all 9 electoral votes. Their chosen electors then vote for president and vice president. Although electors are pledged to their candidate and running mate, they are not obligated to vote for them. An elector who votes for someone other than his or her candidate is known as a faithless elector.

The electors of each state and the District of Columbia met on December 15, 2008, to cast their votes for president and vice president. The Electoral College itself never meets as one body. Instead the electors from each state and the District of Columbia met in their respective capitols.

The following were the members of the Electoral College from the state. All 9 were pledged to John McCain and Sarah Palin:
Lynn Skidmore
Joe Lavigne
Gordon Giles - He replaced Billy Nungesser, who was absent due to illness.
Alan Seabaugh
Karen Haymon
Charles Davis
Charlie Buckels
Dianne Christopher
Roger F. Villere Jr.

See also
 United States presidential elections in Louisiana
 Presidency of Barack Obama

References

Louisiana
2008 Louisiana elections
2008